Steward may refer to:

Positions or roles 
 Steward (office), a representative of a monarch
 Steward (Methodism), a leader in a congregation and/or district
 Steward, a person responsible for supplies of food to a college, club, or other institution
 Communion steward, a position in the local church responsible for the distribution of the Eucharistic elements
 Horse show steward
 Steward, an official in horse, greyhound racing or car racing
 Steward, another term for majordomo
 Steward, an older term for a flight attendant
 A member of the Steward's Department of a ship, responsible for preparation of food or caring for living quarters
 Steward, United States Navy rate prior to 1975, now Culinary Specialist (US Navy)
 Union steward, a labor union official, also known as a shop steward
 Wine steward or sommelier
 Steward, a person who assists with crowd control
 Steward, a junior officer of a Masonic Lodge

People 
 Steward (surname)
 Steward Ceus (born 1987), footballer
 J. Steward Davis (1890-after 1928), American lawyer and political activist

Schools 
 Steward School, a private school in Richmond, Virginia, United States
 Stewards Academy, a secondary school in Harlow, Essex, England
 The Stewards Society, a collegiate secret society at Georgetown University

Geography 
 Steward, Illinois, United States, a village
 Steward Creek, a stream in Minnesota

Other uses 
 15371 Steward, an asteroid
 Steward Health Care System, a health care organization in New England
 Steward Observatory, department of astronomy, University of Arizona
 Stewards (paramilitary organization), a wing of the British Union of Fascists

See also 
 Osbern the Steward, 11th century steward of two Dukes of Normandy
 Steward's Lodge, official residence of the taoiseach of Ireland
 Stewards of Gondor, rulers from J. R. R. Tolkien's legendarium of Middle-earth
 High Steward (disambiguation)
 Stewards' Cup (disambiguation)
 Stewardship
 Stewart (disambiguation)
 Stuart (disambiguation)